The Serenyi (German: Die Serenyi) is a 1918 German silent film directed by Alfred Halm and starring Lya Mara, Erich Kaiser-Titz, and Conrad Veidt. It is a lost film.

Cast
 Lya Mara
 Erich Kaiser-Titz
 Conrad Veidt
 Lupu Pick
 Leopold von Ledebur

References

Bibliography
 John T. Soister. Conrad Veidt on Screen: A Comprehensive Illustrated Filmography. McFarland, 2002.

External links

1918 films
Films of the German Empire
German silent feature films
Films directed by Alfred Halm
German black-and-white films
Films based on German novels
1910s German films